Rubén Baraja Vegas (born 11 July 1975) is a Spanish retired footballer, currently manager of Valencia.

A complete central midfielder with good tackling, technique, and offensive qualities, together with accurate passing and goalscoring ability, he played mostly for Valencia during a 17-year professional career, being an essential figure in five of the club's major titles, which included two La Liga championships.

Baraja was also a consistent part of the Spain national team for five years, appearing in one World Cup and one European Championship and winning 43 caps. He began work as a head coach in 2015 and was hired by Valencia eight years later.

Playing career

Club
Born in Valladolid, Castile and León, Baraja started his career at local Real Valladolid before moving to Atlético Madrid, where he would spend two and a half seasons with the reserves, first appearing with the first team on 7 February 1999 by playing the second half of a 2–1 away defeat against UD Salamanca. In 1998–99, with the B's in the Segunda División, he scored a career-best 11 goals.

When Atlético was relegated at the end of 1999–2000, Baraja left the club in a 2,000 million pesetas transfer to that year's UEFA Champions League finalists Valencia CF, who were looking to strengthen their central midfield following the sale of first-team players Gerard and Javier Farinós. In his first season he was a key element in the Ches Champions League run, as they were beaten in the final for the second year running, this time losing in a penalty shootout to FC Bayern Munich, with the player scoring on his attempt.

2001–02 would see Baraja's first trophy win, where his goals late in the campaign helped Valencia to their first La Liga title in 31 years – he finished as team top scorer in the league, netting seven in only 17 league games after recovering from a knee injury. 2003–04 was another big year, winning both the domestic championship (with eight league goals from him) as well as the UEFA Cup, beating Olympique de Marseille 2–0 in the final.

In 2006–07, Baraja only made 14 league appearances as Valencia finished fourth, and continued to be constantly bothered by physical problems in the following years. After two respectable seasons, often partnering longtime central midfield partner David Albelda, he was again greatly troubled by injuries in the 2009–10 campaign, featuring in only 18 matches (two complete). 

Baraja closed his chapter at the Mestalla Stadium after one full decade on 16 May 2010, receiving homages before and after the 1–0 home win over CD Tenerife and being replaced to a standing ovation in the 89th minute. The 35-year-old announced his retirement shortly after, having appeared in 338 top-flight games over 15 seasons and scored 47 goals.

International
Baraja made his debut for Spain on 7 October 2000, in the 2002 FIFA World Cup qualification 2–0 defeat of Israel. Consequently, he was picked for the final stages, where the team reached the quarter-finals before being sent out by co-hosts South Korea on penalties, though the player, as the year before with Valencia, once again scored on his attempt; he scored from a header during regulation time, but saw his goal disallowed for alleged shirt pulling and pushing in the Korean penalty area.

Baraja also took part in the disappointing UEFA Euro 2004 tournament, where Spain was eliminated in the group stage by eventual finalists Portugal and Greece. He was left out of the 2006 World Cup squad, as his club presence was also diminished due to recurrent injuries.

Coaching career
Early years
In June 2011, Baraja returned to former team Atlético Madrid as part of newly appointed manager Gregorio Manzano's staff. In the summer of 2013 he returned to main club Valencia, first coaching the youths. 

On 22 December 2013, Baraja took interim charge of the reserves in the Segunda División B as Nico Estévez was doing the same for the first team, and achieved a 2–1 win at UE Sant Andreu.

Segunda División
Baraja was appointed manager of Elche CF, newly relegated to the second tier, on 12 July 2015. On 6 June of the following year, he resigned after failing to agree new terms.

On 8 November 2016, Baraja took the reins at fellow league team Rayo Vallecano. After only three wins from 13 games, he was sacked on 20 February 2017 as they sat a point above the relegation places.

Baraja was appointed at Sporting de Gijón on 12 December 2017. Towards the end of the season, he received a four-match ban and a €3,005 fine for preventing FC Barcelona B's Sergi Palencia from taking a throw-in; this included the first game of the play-offs, in which eventual champions Valladolid eliminated the Asturians 5–2 on aggregate in the semi-finals.

On 18 November 2018, Baraja was dismissed after losing the Asturian derby against Real Oviedo, leaving the team in 14th position with a streak of only one win from 11 matches. In December of the following year, he became coach of CD Tenerife in the same league, managing to avoid relegation but still leaving on 20 July 2020.

Baraja replaced Víctor Fernández at the helm of Real Zaragoza on 20 August 2020. He was relieved of his duties on 9 November, after a poor start to the season.

Valencia
On 14 February 2023, Baraja returned to his former club Valencia as head coach, taking over a team that had slipped from 14th to 18th since the dismissal of Gennaro Gattuso; long-time teammate Carlos Marchena was part of his coaching team. His first top-flight game as a manager came six days later in a 1–0 loss at Getafe CF.

Personal life
Baraja's younger brother, Javier, was also a professional footballer. A defender, he too graduated at Valladolid, and went on to spend most of his senior career there.

Career statistics
Club

Notes

International

Scores and results list Spain's goal tally first, score column indicates score after each Baraja goal.

Managerial statistics

HonoursValenciaLa Liga: 2001–02, 2003–04
Copa del Rey: 2007–08
UEFA Cup: 2003–04
UEFA Super Cup: 2004Individual'
ESM Team of the Year: 2001–02
UEFA Super Cup Man of the Match: 2004

References

External links

CiberChe biography and stats 

1975 births
Living people
Spanish footballers
Footballers from Valladolid
Association football midfielders
La Liga players
Segunda División players
Segunda División B players
Real Valladolid Promesas players
Real Valladolid players
Atlético Madrid B players
Atlético Madrid footballers
Valencia CF players
UEFA Cup winning players
Spain youth international footballers
Spain international footballers
2002 FIFA World Cup players
UEFA Euro 2004 players
Spanish football managers
La Liga managers
Segunda División managers
Segunda División B managers
Valencia CF Mestalla managers
Elche CF managers
Rayo Vallecano managers
Sporting de Gijón managers
CD Tenerife managers
Real Zaragoza managers
Valencia CF managers
Valencia CF non-playing staff